The Castle of Buitrago del Lozoya (Spanish: Castillo de Buitrago del Lozoya) is a castle located inside the walls of Buitrago del Lozoya, Community of Madrid region, Spain.

It was built in the 15th century in Gothic-Mudéjar style. It has a rectangular plan, with seven towers of various shapes (round, pentagonal, square), all in stone. The interior is in ruins.

It was declared Bien de Interés Cultural in 1931.

See also
List of Bienes de Interés Cultural in Madrid

References 

Castles in the Community of Madrid
Mudéjar architecture in the Community of Madrid
Gothic architecture in the Community of Madrid
Buildings and structures completed in the 15th century
Bien de Interés Cultural landmarks in the Community of Madrid